Bears' Cave is located in the western Apuseni Mountains, on the outskirts of Chișcău village, Bihor County, northwestern Romania. It was discovered in 1975 by Speodava, an amateur spelaeologist group.  

Bears' Cave received its name after the 140 cave bear skeletons which were discovered on the site in 1983. The cave bear, also known as Ursus spelaeus, is a species of bear which became extinct during the Last Glacial Maximum, about 27,500 years ago.

The cave has three galleries and four halls: The Candles Hall, Emil Racovita Hall, The Spaghetti Hall and The Bones Hall.

Gallery

References 

 Oradea University: Peștera Urșilor

External links 

 Description of the Bears' Cave  
  
  

Caves of Romania
Tourism in Romania
Western Carpathians